The Bouveault–Blanc reduction is a chemical reaction in which an ester is reduced to primary alcohols using absolute ethanol and sodium metal.  It was first reported by Louis Bouveault and Gustave Louis Blanc in 1903.  Bouveault and Blanc demonstrated the reduction of ethyl oleate and n-butyl oleate to oleyl alcohol. Modified versions of which were subsequently refined and published in Organic Syntheses.

This reaction is used commercially although for laboratory scale reactions it was made obsolete by the introduction of lithium aluminium hydride.

Reaction mechanism
Sodium metal is a one-electron reducing agent.  Four equivalents of sodium are required to fully reduce each ester. Ethanol serves as a proton source. The reaction produces sodium alkoxides, according to the following stoichiometry:
   +   6 Na   +   4    →      +      +   4 
In practice, considerable sodium is consumed by the formation of hydrogen.  For this reason, an excess of sodium is often required. Because the hydrolysis of sodium is rapid, not to mention dangerous, the Bouveault-Blanc reaction requires anhydrous ethanol. The mechanism of the reaction follows:

Consistent with this mechanism, sodium-ethanol mixtures will also reduce ketones to alcohols.

This approach to reducing esters was widely used prior to the availability of hydride reducing agents such as lithium aluminium hydride and related reagents.  It requires vigorous reaction conditions and has a significant risk of fires, explaining its relative unpopularity.  One modification involves encapsulating the alkali metal into a silica gel, which has a safety and yield profile similar to that of hydride reagents.  Another modification uses a sodium dispersion.

See also
Acyloin condensation – The reductive coupling of esters, using sodium, to yield an α-hydroxyketone
Akabori amino-acid reaction – The reduction of amino acid esters, by sodium, to yield aldehydes
Birch reduction – For the reduction of alkenes using sodium
Bouveault aldehyde synthesis – Another organometallic reaction by Bouveault where a Grignard reagent is converted to an aldehyde

References

External links 
 Animation of the Bouveault–Blanc reduction

Free radical reactions
Organic redox reactions
Name reactions